Marco Sabbatani (born 13 April 1989) is an Italian professional baseball catcher for A.S.D. Castenaso in the Italian Baseball League.

Sabbatani was selected as a member of the Italy national baseball team at the 2017 World Baseball Classic.

References

External links

1989 births
2016 European Baseball Championship players
2017 World Baseball Classic players
Baseball pitchers
De Angelis North East Knights players
Fortitudo Baseball Bologna players
Italian baseball players
Living people
Sportspeople from Ravenna
Unipol Bologna players